Fürstenau is a Samtgemeinde ("collective municipality") in the district of Osnabrück, in Lower Saxony, Germany. Its seat is in the town Fürstenau.

The Samtgemeinde Fürstenau consists of the following municipalities:
 Berge 
 Bippen 
 Fürstenau

Samtgemeinden in Lower Saxony